Rivka "Riki" Blich (born September 29, 1979) is an Israeli actress and comedian.

She was born to parents who immigrated from Soviet Russia in 1973.

History

1991
In 1991, when Riki was 12 years old, she made her debut on Channel 1 in the channel's children's show Headcatching a Head hosted by Nathan Datner along with other young actors such as Dana Dvorin.

Filmography

TV-series
2003: Esti HaMekho'eret
2004: Ktzarim
2005: Elvis, Rosenthal, VeHaIsha Hamistorit
2006: Elvis
2006: Lo Hivtachti Lach

Films
1994: Under the Domim Tree
2002: Bechora
2004: Delusions
2006: A Wedding Film
2011: Stitches

References

External links

1979 births
Living people
Israeli film actresses
Thelma Yellin High School of Arts alumni
Israeli people of Russian-Jewish descent